HNLMS Den Helder is a new replenishment oiler under construction for the Royal Netherlands Navy. Also known as the Combat Support Ship (CSS), Den Helder is planned to fill the gap of replenishment at sea that was left after  was sold to Peru in 2014.

History
In 2017 a study started to look at the possibility of a new tanker to fulfill this task.

In 2019 the so called D-letter, the final process before the contract can be signed, was sent to the Tweede Kamer for approval. With the contract signing following two months later on the bridge of Karel Doorman.

The ship carries two 40-ton cranes and can carry up to 24 sea containers. It can dispense  of diesel (including for its own use),  of helicopter fuel (including for its own use),  of drinking water and 434 tons of other goods, including ammunition. The vessel can accommodate up to two NH-90 helicopters or, alternatively, one NH-90 and two UAVs. It carries two LCVPs (Landing Craft Vehicle Personnel) and 2 FRISC (Fast Raiding and Intercept Craft). The ship's infirmary operates as a Role 2 hospital (providing limited hospital capability, including surgery).

Naming
The name was revealed in a ceremony in honor of the 10.000 model, which was the new CSS, at MARIN. In attendance were the Commander of the Royal Netherlands Navy: Rob Kramer, the State Secretary for Defence: Barbara Visser, the State Secretary for Economic Affairs and Climate Policy: Mona Keijzer and the CEO of Damen Schelde Naval Shipbuilding.

It is the first time a vessel is named after Den Helder.

Construction

The first steel was cut in a ceremony on 2 December 2020 at the Damen yard in Galați. On 2 June Damen Shipyards Galați has performed the keel-laying ceremony on the Combat Support Ship (CSS) Den Helder. The keel-laying ceremony was performed by the Director Defence Material Organisation (DMO), vice admiral Arie Jan de Waard and vice admiral Rob Kramer, Commander Royal Netherlands Navy (RNLN). The ship was formally laid down on 2 June 2021. The assembled ship was floated and moved to another part of the building dock in October 2022 with work expected to continue through 2023. Sea trials are anticipated in early 2024.

Similar ships

 Aotearoa class

See also
 Future of the Royal Netherlands Navy

References

Auxiliary ships of the Royal Netherlands Navy
Auxiliary replenishment ship classes